Medvezichnus is a peculiar ichnofossil described by  Mikhail A Fedonkin in 1985 in the "Systematic Description of Vendian Metazoa". The fossil of Medvezichnus pudicum is described as "a unique specimen of doubtful nature". In 'Neoproterozoic Geobiology and Paleobiology', it's stated that this form requires further documentation, alongside Nenoxites and Bilinichnus.

See also
 List of Ediacaran genera

References

Ediacaran
Ediacaran life
Enigmatic prehistoric animal genera
Trace fossils
Prehistoric animal genera
Fossil taxa described in 1985